Lisa Anne Houghton is a New Zealand-based scientist, professor and head of the Department of Human Nutrition at the University of Otago.

Academic career 

Houghton graduated from the University of Guelph, Ontario, Canada with a MSc (1996) for her thesis titled "The Influence of Dietary Fiber on the Folate Status of a Group of Adolescent Females".  Following graduation, she worked at Acadia University as assistant professor, at The Hospital for Sick Children in Toronto before moving to the United States to work at Abbott Laboratories in the Premature Infant Nutrition division.

She completed a PhD (2007) in nutritional sciences at the University of Toronto. Her thesis was "The effect of folate supplementation on folate status and breastmilk folate concentration in lactating women".

Houghton moved to New Zealand in 2008 to take up a lecturing role at the University of Otago. She was promoted to associate professor in November 2015. In December 2019 she, along with two of her colleagues Rachel Brown and Caroline Horwath, was promoted to full professor with effect from 1 February 2020. She combines her academic role with that of director of the World Health Organization Collaborating Centre in Human Nutrition.

Selected works

References

External links 

 

Living people
Year of birth missing (living people)
University of Guelph alumni
University of Toronto alumni
Academic staff of the University of Otago
New Zealand women academics